Stuart Edward Gray (born 18 December 1973) is a football player and actor.

Gray represented Celtic and Reading as a full-back and won seven Scotland under-21 international caps.

He comes from a footballing family; his father Eddie, uncle Frank and cousin Andy have all represented Scotland.

In the 2009 film The Damned United, Gray portrayed his father Eddie Gray.

Career
Gray was signed to Celtic as a schoolboy S-former in 1989 and followed the route of many on to the groundstaff at 16 in 1990. He played youth and reserve team football, and was released to play for Giffnock Park North AFC. He ended the 91–92 season close to a first team call up and won a new two-year contract. The next season marked his debut with one appearance against Aberdeen 92–93 but a groin strain in October curtailed his 92–93 season. In the 93–94 season he lost his edge playing with the Premier reserves and asked for a loan move south of the border. He spent some time on loan with AFC Bournemouth in February before returning to more reserve team action. At the end of the season he went to Canada on the post-season tournament with the senior team.

Out of contract at the start of the 94–95 season, he was wanted by Sunderland and Blackburn Rovers and signing month-to-month deals. He eventually signed a new deal on 27 January 1995 with the stated intention of leaving if he did not get more first team football. He had a reasonable run of games and was on the verge of the full-time first team inclusion.

In the 95–96 season he won starting appearances in the latter part of the season but an ankle ligament injury proved troubling and curtailed full involvement. The 96–97 season was troubled by a knee injury, and he ended playing most of the season with the reserves. Out of contract again, his future looked uncertain. A deal to take him to Lille fell through in the close season and he began the 97–98 season on month-to-month deals. In October he was loaned to Greenock Morton until January 1998, being recalled from Greenock to play against them in the Scottish Cup tie on 24 January. He played a few more reserve games before being sold to Tommy Burns at Reading on 26 March 1998.

He was loaned to Rushden & Diamonds and joined them full-time in January 2001 and released at the end of the 04–05 season. He joined Oxford United making 10 appearances with them. He has since been associated with non-league side Guiseley and he coaches the reserve team there along with Vince Brockie.

References

External links

1973 births
Living people
Sportspeople from Harrogate
Celtic F.C. players
Reading F.C. players
Greenock Morton F.C. players
Rushden & Diamonds F.C. players
Oxford United F.C. players
Scottish footballers
Scotland under-21 international footballers
Association football fullbacks
Guiseley A.F.C. players
Scottish Football League players
Stuart
Anglo-Scots